Joelle James is an American singer-songwriter, best known for writing the lyric melody of Ella Mai's "Boo'd Up", which was nominated for Song of the Year and won Best R&B Song at the 61st Annual Grammy Awards, and is the longest charting number one R&B/Hip-Hop record for a female artist on the Billboard Hot R&B/Hip-Hop Airplay charts since its inception in 1992.  A top 40 finalist on Season 6 of American Idol and graduate of the Berklee College of Music, James was discovered by Chris Brown in 2012. Brown subsequently signed her to a label deal with CBE and Interscope Records. James has also written songs for Ella Mai, Saweetie, Justine Skye and JoJo, among others.

Songwriting and Production credits
Credits are courtesy of Discogs, Tidal, Apple Music, and AllMusic.

Guest Appearances

Film/TV Sync Placements

Awards and nominations

References

External links

21st-century American singers
American rhythm and blues singer-songwriters
Living people
Roc Nation artists